This is a list of broadcasters for the Calgary Flames ice hockey team.

Radio
CFAC is the radio flagship for broadcasts of the Calgary Flames of the National Hockey League (play-by-play by Derek Wills, colour by Peter Loubardias) and the Calgary Hitmen of the Western Hockey League (play-by-play by Brad Curle, colour by Ken Thrower). It also features live coverage of  Major League Baseball's Toronto Blue Jays and select games of the National Football League.

Notes
Peter Maher was the radio voice of the NHL's Calgary Flames from their move to Calgary, Alberta, Canada in 1980 until his retirement following the 2013-14 NHL season. He broadcast every Flames game for 33 years straight. He announced Flames games on the city's all-sports radio station, Sportsnet 960 The Fan.  He was best known for bellowing "Yeah Baby!" after a significant or important moment, and "You can put it in the win column!" after every Flames win.

Mike Rogers was the colour commentator for the Calgary Flames on Calgary radio stations for 12 years before announcing his retirement on July 25, 2013.

Television
In 1981, the CFAC-TV moved to its new home, the Calgary Television Centre, a move reflecting its growth since its disaffiliation from the CBC. After obtaining the television rights to the (then-newly relocated) Calgary Flames National Hockey League franchise the year before, the station purchased a seven-camera mobile unit soon after. The station has been the Flames' television partner since 1980. 

The Sportsnet One license is also used for a series of part-time multiplex channels which carry regional National Hockey League coverage, for selected Vancouver Canucks, Edmonton Oilers, and Calgary Flames games. The channels themselves are only carried within the respective teams' territories.

Notes
Peter Loubardias worked for Rogers Sportsnet as a play-by-play commentator for the Calgary Flames from 2008-2011, as well as numerous Memorial Cup tournaments.

With Rogers Media, the parent company of Sportsnet, gaining the sole national rights to the NHL beginning in the 2014-15 season, in August 2014, Kelly Hrudey joined Sportsnet full time to participate in their hockey coverage. In addition to his Hockey Night in Canada role (which remains on CBC as part of a four year sub-licensing deal), he along with Rick Ball became the new announcers for the Calgary Flames regional broadcasts.

On November 26, 2013, after Rogers Communications secured a $5.2 billion deal with the National Hockey League for 12 years, Cassie Campbell then joined Sportsnet's broadcast team to back-up Kelly Hrudey, in addition to her Hockey Night in Canada role.

See also
List of current National Hockey League broadcasters
Historical NHL over-the-air television broadcasters
Atlanta_Flames#Broadcasters

References

External links
Sportsnet releases 2019-20 Calgary Flames broadcast schedule
Sportsnet announces changes to Calgary Flames broadcast team 

Calgary Flames announcers
Calgary Flames lists
Lists of National Hockey League broadcasters
Sportsnet